Chilozela is a genus of moths of the family Crambidae. It contains only one species, Chilozela trapeziana, which is found from Costa Rica south to Peru.

The larvae feed on the leaves of Manihot esculenta.

References

Glaphyriinae
Monotypic moth genera
Moths of Central America
Moths of South America
Crambidae genera
Taxa named by Eugene G. Munroe